The Hankyoreh Democratic Party (HDP) was a political party of South Korea from 1988 to 1991.

History
The party was formed in 1988 as the alternative for 2 main oppositions ― Reunification Democratic Party and Peace Democratic Party. The original name was National Democratic Party (Korean: 민족민주당), but changed as "sounds like an extremist". Most of members were the crucial figure of the League of National Democratic Youth and Students in 1970s.

The formation took on 17 February 1988, and officially on 29 March. Ye Chun-ho was elected as the Permanent President.

The party participated in 1988 election. Nevertheless, all candidates from party leadership i.e. Ye Chun-ho, Cho Soon-hyung, Goh Young-gu, Yoo In-tae, and so on were lost. Park Hyung-oh, who ran for Shinan, was the sole elected representative due to the political ban of Han Hwa-gap (Peace Democratic Party aka PDP). Park subsequently joined PDP due to the pre-agreement, made the party as an extra-parliamentary.

After a serious defeat in the general election, the majority of its members left the party and formed the Popular Party in 1989, while some other members joined the Democratic Party (known as Little Democrats). The party soon couldn't meet up with the minimal requirements as a political party, and was deregistered on 13 March 1991.

Election results

Notable figures
 Ye Chun-ho
 Cho Soon-hyung
 Goh Young-gu
 Yoo In-tae
 Kim Boo-kyum

See also
 The Hankyoreh

References

Defunct political parties in South Korea
Democratic parties in South Korea
Political parties established in 1988
1988 establishments in South Korea
Political parties disestablished in 1991
1991 disestablishments in South Korea
Progressive parties in South Korea